Oedipus Rex is a play by Sophocles.

Oedipus Rex may also refer to:

 Oedipus, a king of Thebes in Greek mythology
 Pseudoeurycea rex, a salamander species formerly known as Oedipus rex

Literature and media
 Edipo re, an opera published posthumously as by Ruggero Leoncavallo
 Oedipus (Seneca)
 Oedipus rex (opera), an opera-oratorio by Igor Stravinsky
 Oedipus Rex (1957 film), a film version of the Canadian Stratford Festival production, using the William Butler Yeats text
 Oedipus Rex (1967 film), an Italian film directed by Pier Paolo Pasolini
 Oedipus Rex, a song by Tom Lehrer from the album An Evening Wasted with Tom Lehrer
 Oedipus the King (1968 film), directed by Philip Saville